Adriana Maldonado López is a Spanish politician who has been serving as a Member of the European Parliament since 2019.

Political career
In parliament, Maldonado López has since been serving on the Committee on the Internal Market and Consumer Protection. In 2022, she also joined the Special Committee on the COVID-19 pandemic.  

In addition to her committee assignments, Maldonado López has been part of the parliament's delegation for relations with the Pan-African Parliament since 2021. She is also a member of the European Parliament Intergroup on Artificial Intelligence and Digital and the European Parliament Intergroup on Small and Medium-Sized Enterprises (SMEs).

References

1990 births
Living people
MEPs for Spain 2019–2024
21st-century women MEPs for Spain
Spanish Socialist Workers' Party MEPs